José Demetrio Rodríguez (1760–1846) was a Spanish botanist.

1760 births
1846 deaths
19th-century Spanish botanists
18th-century Spanish botanists